Sam Thomas (born June 14, 1999) is an American professional basketball player who plays for the Phoenix Mercury in the Women's National Basketball Association (WNBA). She played college basketball at Arizona.

College career
Thomas committed to Arizona career after being ranked 92nd overall by ESPN HoopGurlz for the 2017 Class. She was the highest rated Wildcat recruit coming in from the class. During her freshman season, Thomas started all 30 games for the Wildcats and scored the 10th most points in Arizona history by a freshman with 306. Thomas earned the Pac-12 All-Freshman team for her year.

Her sophomore season, Thomas began to standout more for her defensive efforts. She led the Wildcat team in blocks and was second in steals. She again started every single game, scored 9.1 points, and was very consistent with the ball - only having 29 turnovers for the entire year. During her junior season, Thomas earned Honorable Mention All-Pac-12 and was named to the Pac-12 All-Defensive Team. Thomas scored a career-high 31 points, including going 13-for-13 from the free line on February 21, 2020, against Utah.

During her senior season, Thomas helped the Wildcats earn a trip to the Women's Final Four. While at the Final Four, Thomas was awarded the Elite 90 Award - the player with the best GPA of any student-athlete at the Final Four. She led the team in blocks and was second on the team in steals. Thomas came back for her extra-COVID year and helped guide the Wildcats back to the NCAA Tournament. She became the first player in program history to repeat as a CoSIDA Academic All-American. She made the Pac-12 All-Defensive again for the third straight year and was a Pac-12 Honorable Mention selection.

College statistics

Professional career

Phoenix Mercury
Thomas went undrafted in the 2022 WNBA draft, but signed a training camp contract with the Phoenix Mercury. Sam made the Opening Night roster for the 2022 season with the Mercury.

WNBA career statistics

Regular season

|-
| align="left" | 2022
| align="left" | Phoenix
| 24 || 0 || 4.9 || .211 || .067 || 1.000 || 0.2 || 0.3 || 0.3 || 0.1 || 0.2 || 0.4
|-
| align="left" | Career
| align="left" | 1 year, 1 team
| 24 || 0 || 4.9 || .211 || .067 || 1.000 || 0.2 || 0.3 || 0.3 || 0.1 || 0.2 || 0.4

Playoffs

|-
| align="left" | 2022
| align="left" | Phoenix
| 2 || 0 || 7.0 || .500 || .500 || .000 || 0.0 || 0.0 || 0.5 || 0.0 || 0.0 || 1.5
|-
| align="left" | Career
| align="left" | 1 year, 1 team
| 2 || 0 || 7.0 || .500 || .500 || .000 || 0.0 || 0.0 || 0.5 || 0.0 || 0.0 || 1.5

References

External links
WNBA bio
Arizona Wildcats bio

1999 births
Living people
American women's basketball players
Basketball players from Nevada
Guards (basketball)
Forwards (basketball)
Arizona Wildcats women's basketball players
Phoenix Mercury players
Sportspeople from Las Vegas
Undrafted Women's National Basketball Association players